Ottendorfer is a surname. Notable people with the surname include:

Anna Ottendorfer ( 1815–1884), American journalist and philanthropist
Oswald Ottendorfer (1826–1900), American journalist

See also 
Ottendorfer Public Library and Stuyvesant Polyclinic Hospital, historic building in New York City